Good Morning Scotland is a Scottish breakfast radio news programme. It is broadcast on BBC Radio Scotland weekdays from 06:00 to 09:00. Established in 1973, it is the longest-running radio show broadcast from Scotland and remains one of the most popular. Weekend editions, broadcast between 08:00 and 10:00, were introduced in early 2015.

Based in many respects on BBC Radio 4's Today programme, it consists of regular news, sport, business, travel and weather bulletins along with interviews, in-depth reports and a daily religious slot Thought for the Day.

History 
The programme was launched on the morning of 31 December 1973 with presenters David Findlay and John Milne. Prior to GMS, radio producers Geoff Cameron and Allan Muirhead were responsible for producing a daily opt-out from Today, called Today in Scotland. Its popularity led to the subsequent Good Morning Scotland.

In 1980, to celebrate 50 years of broadcasting from the BBC's Edinburgh studios at Queen Street, Good Morning Scotland was simulcast on BBC One Scotland for a week, pioneering breakfast television on the BBC (ITV station Yorkshire Television had broadcast a breakfast programme for six weeks during 1977 and thus laid claim to the first semi-regular British breakfast television broadcast).

In 2006 there some major changes to the show, including a change of presenters with Gary Robertson brought in.

The programme had an estimated 455,000 listeners in 2008, which fell to 380,000 the following year.

Local variations 
The first half of the programme is also broadcast on BBC Scotland's Gaelic-language station, BBC Radio nan Gàidheal before its Gaelic counterpart Aithris Na Maidne begins at 07:30.

Listeners in Orkney opt-out between 07:30 and 08:00 for Around Orkney, a 30-minute magazine programme with features, local news and weather, diary, jobspot, mart report and postbag.

There are also local news opt-outs from Selkirk for the Borders, Dumfries for the South West, Aberdeen for the North East and Inverness for the Highlands.

Current presenters 
 Gary Robertson
 Laura Maxwell
 Martin Geissler (Relief/Fridays)
 Laura Maciver (Relief/Fridays)

Former presenters 
 John Milne
 Douglas Kynoch
 Mary Marquis
 James Cox
 Mike Russell
 Joanna Buchan
 Neville Garden
 Eddie Mair
 Louise White
 Anne MacKenzie (1995–1997)
 Derek Bateman (1996–2006)
 Mhairi Stuart (1999–2006)
 Abeer MacIntyre
 Gillian Marles (2005–2009)
 Aasmah Mir (2009)

Morning Extra
Morning Extra was an associated phone-in programme broadcast from 09.05 - 10.00. Presented by Graham Stewart, it usually debated one of the biggest stories running on Good Morning Scotland. It was previously only 40 minutes long but was extended in 2008 to an hour.

The programme was axed in 2010 and replaced with a phone-in, Call Kaye, presented by Kaye Adams (later replaced by Morning Call). The last edition of Morning Extra aired on 26 February.

References

External links 
 

BBC Radio Scotland programmes
BBC Radio programmes
1973 radio programme debuts
British radio breakfast shows
Radio in Scotland